United States gubernatorial elections were held on November 8, 2022, in 36 states and three territories. As most governors serve four-year terms, the last regular gubernatorial elections for all but two of the seats took place in 2018 U.S. gubernatorial elections. The gubernatorial elections took place concurrently with several other federal, state, and local elections, as part of the 2022 midterm elections.

Democrats performed better than expected, including in closely-watched races in Kansas, Michigan, Pennsylvania, and Wisconsin, and the party picked up the governorships of Arizona, Maryland, and Massachusetts. Republicans picked up the governorship of Nevada, making incumbent Democrat Steve Sisolak the only incumbent to lose his seat, the first Democrat since the 2014 Illinois gubernatorial election, and the first of any party since the 2019 Kentucky gubernatorial election. 

This is the first midterm cycle since 1998 in which the non-incumbent party suffered net losses, the first since 1986 in which the incumbent party gained seats overall, and the first since 1934 in which the president's party made net gains in both Senate seats and governorships. Democrats won the popular vote in this gubernatorial election cycle by 0.3 points, making this the closest midterm gubernatorial election cycle since at least 1990. However, the 2019 off-year elections were won by Democrats with a smaller margin of 0.01 points.

Partisan composition
Going into the election, there are 28 Republican governors and 22 Democratic governors in the United States. This class of governors is made up of 20 Republicans and 16 Democrats. In contrast to 2018, where Republicans were defending eight seats in states won by Hillary Clinton in the 2016 U.S. presidential election, Republicans hold six seats in states won by Joe Biden in the 2020 U.S. presidential election. Meanwhile, Democrats were defending three governorships in states Trump won in 2016 but not 2020 (Pennsylvania, Michigan, and Wisconsin) and one governorship in a state that Trump won in 2020 (Kansas).

Election predictions
Several sites and individuals publish predictions of competitive seats. These predictions look at factors such as the strength of the incumbent (if the incumbent is running for re-election), the strength of the candidates, and the partisan leanings of the state (reflected in part by the state's Cook Partisan Voting Index rating). The predictions assign ratings to each state, with the rating indicating the predicted advantage that a party has in winning that seat.

Most election predictors use:
 "tossup": no advantage
 "tilt" (used by some predictors): advantage that is not quite as strong as "lean"
 "lean": slight advantage
 "likely": significant, but surmountable, advantage 
 "safe" or "solid": near-certain chance of victory

Race summary

States

Territories and federal district

Closest races 
States where the margin of victory was under 1%:
 Arizona, 0.66%

States where the margin of victory was under 5%:
 Nevada, 1.51%
 Kansas, 2.21%
 Wisconsin, 3.40%
 Oregon, 3.42%

States where the margin of victory was under 10%:
 New Mexico, 6.38%
 New York, 6.40%
 Georgia, 7.54%
 Minnesota, 7.67%
 Northern Mariana Islands, 8.28%

Blue denotes races won by Democrats. Red denotes races won by Republicans. Grey denotes races won by Independents.

Alabama

Incumbent Republican Governor Kay Ivey took office on April 10, 2017, upon the resignation of former Governor Robert J. Bentley, and was elected to a full term in 2018. She ran for re-election to a second full term in which she won her re-election bid in a landslide.

Primary elections in Alabama were held on May 24. Runoff elections for instances where no candidate received 50% plus one vote were scheduled for June 21. A runoff was avoided in the Republican primary, with Ivey winning outright. The Democratic primary advanced to a runoff between Malika Sanders-Fortier and Yolanda Flowers, with Flowers winning the Democratic nomination.

This was the first gubernatorial election in Alabama history in which both major party nominees were women. Flowers was also the first Black female gubernatorial nominee in Alabama. Governor Ivey was re-elected and sworn in for her second full term on January 16, 2023.

This is the only gubernatorial election in the 2020s to be won by a member of the Silent Generation.

Alaska

 
Incumbent Republican Governor Mike Dunleavy won re-election to a second term, becoming the first Republican governor to be re-elected to a second term since Jay Hammond in 1978 and the first governor, regardless of political affiliation, to be re-elected to a second term since Tony Knowles in 1998.

Arizona

Incumbent Republican governor Doug Ducey was term-limited and ineligible to run for a third consecutive term. Democratic Arizona Secretary of State Katie Hobbs won the election against Republican former television anchor Kari Lake.

Primaries were held on August 2 for both parties, with Lake winning the Republican nomination and Hobbs winning the Democratic nomination, making this the first gubernatorial election in Arizona history in which both major party candidates for governor were women. Hobbs became the fifth female governor of Arizona, with Arizona setting a record for the most female governors in American history. With the concurrent passage of Proposition 131, this will be the last gubernatorial election in Arizona without a lieutenant governor on the ticket.

Going into the election, most polling had Lake leading and analysts generally considered the race to either be a tossup or leaning towards the Republican. Nonetheless, Hobbs ultimately defeated Lake with 50.32% of the vote, becoming the first Democrat elected governor of Arizona since Janet Napolitano in 2006. Lake refused to concede and filed a post-election lawsuit in an attempt to overturn the results, with all her claims either being dismissed or ruled against for lack of evidence.

This race was one of six Republican-held governorships up for election in 2022 taking place in a state that was carried by Democrat Joe Biden in the 2020 presidential election. With a margin of 0.67%, it was the closest election of the 2022 gubernatorial election cycle.

Arkansas

Incumbent Republican Governor Asa Hutchinson is term-limited and could not seek re-election to a third term. Arkansas is one of the nine states and one territory of the United States that limit governors to two terms for life in their constitutions, along with California, Delaware, Maryland, Michigan, Mississippi, Missouri, Nevada, the Northern Mariana Islands, and Oklahoma. Sarah Huckabee Sanders was sworn in on January 10, 2023.

Primary elections in Arkansas were held on May 24. Runoff elections for instances where no candidate receives over 50% of the vote were scheduled for June 21. Former White House press secretary Sarah Huckabee Sanders won the Republican nomination, while Chris Jones won the Democratic nomination.

Leading up to the Republican Primary, Sanders received many endorsements from key Republican figures, including Donald Trump, Mike Pence, incumbent Asa Hutchinson, Arkansas' entire U.S. Congressional delegation, and dozens of GOP representatives from the State House and State Senate. She cruised to a landslide victory in the primary, and as Arkansas is a GOP stronghold, her victory virtually guaranteed she would win the general election, in which she defeated Jones by 28 points. Jones became the first Democrat to win Washington County since 2010, and Sanders became the first Republican to win majority-Black Crittenden County since her father in 1998. This is the first time ever that a Republican won three straight gubernatorial elections in the state's history.

Sanders became the first female Governor of Arkansas, as well as the first daughter of a former governor to take office in United States history. In addition, with the election of Leslie Rutledge as lieutenant governor, Arkansas, along with Massachusetts, became the first two U.S. states to have both a female governor and female lieutenant Governor serving at the same time.

California

Incumbent Democratic Party Governor Gavin Newsom ran and won re-election to a second term after surviving a recall election in 2021, during his first term.

The elections featured universal mail-in ballots; in-person voting was also available. All statewide elected offices are currently held by Democrats. Newsom won 61.9% of the vote in both the 2018 gubernatorial election and the 2021 recall election. He received 55.9% of the top-two primary vote and faced Republican Party state senator Brian Dahle, who received 17.7% of the primary vote, in the general election. Newsom easily won re-election with 59.2% of the vote to Dahle's 40.8%, but with a smaller margin of victory than in 2018. Dahle flipped five counties that Newsom carried in 2018, namely Lake, Merced (although Merced voted to recall Newsom), Orange, San Bernardino, and San Joaquin. Dahle received 32% of the vote in Los Angeles County, a respectable performance for a Republican in the Democratic stronghold.

Colorado

Incumbent Democratic Governor Jared Polis won re-election to a second term, defeating Republican University of Colorado regent Heidi Ganahl. The primary election was held on June 28.

Polis's 2022 victory marked the first time in American history that an openly gay politician was re-elected governor of a state. Polis had the best performance for a re-elected Colorado governor since Bill Owens in 2002, the best for a Democrat since Roy Romer in 1990, and the highest raw vote total ever in a Colorado gubernatorial race.

Connecticut

Governor Ned Lamont was elected in 2018 with 49.4% of the vote and is ran for re-election for a second term. The race simultaneously took place with the election to the state's Class III Senate seat. This election featured a rematch of the previous 2018 gubernatorial election, pitting Lamont against Republican Bob Stefanowski, who he previously defeated by 3.2% of the vote. This time Lamont won re-election by a wider margin, becoming the first Democrat to win a gubernatorial election by more than 5 points in the state since 1986. This is the first time since 1994 that Tolland County voted Democratic in a gubernatorial election.

Florida

Governor Ron DeSantis was elected in 2018 with 49.6% of the vote and ran for reelection to a second term. Andrew Gillum, former mayor of Tallahassee and Democratic nominee for governor in 2018, did not run against DeSantis again.

U.S. Representative and former Republican governor of Florida Charlie Crist was the Democratic nominee. Also seeking the Democratic nomination was Florida Agriculture Commissioner Nikki Fried.

DeSantis won re-election by a sizable margin due to the state as a whole swinging further Republican than it voted in the 2020 United States presidential election and continuing the state's rightward shift since the 2008 United States presidential election. County flips by DeSantis were Miami-Dade, Palm Beach, Hillsborough, and Osceola counties, all of which were previous Democratic party strongholds; these counties, notably, have relatively high Latino populations, for which their growth in support for the Republican Party was further cemented. This election was seen by many to more firmly assert Florida's status as a red state and not a swing state.

Georgia

Incumbent Republican governor Brian Kemp won re-election to a second term, defeating Democratic nominee Stacey Abrams in a rematch. Abrams conceded on election night. The primary occurred on May 24, 2022. Kemp was sworn in for a second term on January 12, 2023.

Kemp was endorsed by former Vice President Mike Pence. He faced a primary challenge from former U.S. Senator David Perdue, who was endorsed by former President Donald Trump after Kemp refused to overturn the results of the 2020 presidential election in Georgia.

Stacey Abrams, the former Minority Leader of the Georgia House of Representatives and founder of Fair Fight Action who was narrowly defeated by Kemp in the 2018 gubernatorial election, was once again the Democratic nominee for the governorship. This was Georgia's first gubernatorial rematch since 1950.

Libertarian Shane T. Hazel, the Libertarian nominee for U.S. Senate in 2020, also declared he would run.  This race was one of six Republican-held governorships up for election in 2022 in a state carried by Joe Biden in the 2020 presidential election.

Despite Kemp's narrow 55,000-vote victory in 2018, which was Georgia's closest gubernatorial election since 1966, he went on to win by 300,000 votes (7.5%) - the largest raw vote victory for a Georgia governor since 2006. The race was seen as a potential benefit to Herschel Walker, who ran in the concurrent Senate race, as it was speculated Kemp's strong performance could help Walker avoid a runoff. He vastly underperformed compared to Kemp, however, and lost to incumbent Democratic Senator Raphael Warnock in the December 6 runoff election.term.

Hawaii

Incumbent Democratic Governor David Ige was term-limited and ineligible to run for a third term. Incumbent lieutenant governor Josh Green was the Democratic nominee, and faced former lieutenant governor Duke Aiona, the Republican nominee. This marked the third time Aiona had been the Republican gubernatorial nominee, having previously run unsuccessfully in 2010 and 2014. Green won the election with 63.2% of the vote with Aiona receiving 36.8% of the vote.

Green's performance was the highest percentage of the vote ever received by any gubernatorial candidate in the state's history. Despite this, Aiona performed 3 points better and received 20,000 more raw votes than Andria Tupola did in 2018.

Idaho

Governor Brad Little was elected in 2018 with 59.8% of the vote and is ran for re-election to a second term. Little won his re-election bid by a landslide, defeating his Democratic challenger Stephen Heidt.

Incumbent lieutenant governor Janice McGeachin announced a primary challenge to Little, but Little won the Republican primary. Anti-government activist Ammon Bundy also announced a run for the Republican nomination, but switched to an Independent on February 17, 2022.

The Democratic nominee is Stephen Heidt.

Illinois

Governor J. B. Pritzker was elected in 2018 with 54.5% of the vote and ran for a second term. In the general election, Pritzker won re-election with 54.9% of the vote.

Republican candidates who announced their candidacy included Richard Irvin, Darren Bailey, Gary Rabine, Paul Schimpf, and Jesse Sullivan. Bailey won the primary on June 28.

Iowa

Governor Kim Reynolds took office on May 24, 2017, upon the resignation of Terry Branstad and was elected to a full term in her own right in 2018 with 50.3% of the vote. She ran for re-election to a second full term. During the General election, Incumbent Republican Governor Kim Reynolds won re-election in a landslide, defeating Democratic nominee Deidre DeJear.

Democrat Deidre DeJear, who announced her candidacy in August 2021, was the Democratic nominee.

Kansas

Governor Laura Kelly, a Democrat, was elected in 2018 with 48% of the vote and ran running for re-election to a second term. On the Republican side, Kansas Attorney General Derek Schmidt ran against her.

Kelly narrowly won re-election, defeating Schmidt by 49.4% of the vote to 47.4% and by a margin of 20,614 votes in a minor upset.

Laura Kelly won the election by a margin of 2.2 percentage points over Derek Schmidt, similar to the percentage of votes that independent Dennis Pyle received. Kansas Republican Party Chair Mike Kuckelman pointed to this as evidence that Pyle was somewhat responsible for Schmidt's defeat. However, Pyle insisted that "Kansas needed a strong conservative candidate" and instead highlighted Schmidt's underperformance compared to other Republican candidates in Kansas.

Kelly's personal popularity was also a factor in her victory, where a majority of voters approved of Kelly's job performance, while only a third did so for President Joe Biden. Her win was also propelled by Democratic candidates' increased strength in suburban areas, such as Johnson County, in spite of Schmidt's increased vote share from 2018 in the Republican strongholds of rural Kansas.

Maine

Governor Janet Mills, a Democrat, was first elected in 2018 with 50.9% of the vote. Mills easily won re-election, soundly defeating Paul LePage by over 13 points, 55.7%–42.4%. Hunkler took 1.9%. Mills's margin of victory was the largest for any Maine gubernatorial candidate since Angus King won re-election in 1998, and the largest victory for a statewide Democratic candidate since George J. Mitchell won re-election to the US Senate in 1988.

Maryland

Incumbent Governor Larry Hogan, the two-term Republican, was term-limited and could not seek re-election to a third consecutive term.

The Democratic and Republican primaries were held on July 19, with state delegate Dan Cox securing the Republican nomination, while author and former nonprofit CEO Wes Moore won the Democratic nomination. Political observers gave Moore a strong chance of defeating Cox in the general election in this reliably Democratic state where Democrats outnumber Republicans 2-to-1. Shortly after polls closed, several national news organizations called the election for Moore. Moore became the first African-American governor of Maryland after being sworn in on January 18, 2023.

This race was also one of six Republican-held governorships up for election in 2022 in a state carried by Joe Biden in the 2020 presidential election, and one of three that voted for Biden by double-digits. Moore flipped six counties that had voted for Hogan in 2018, and his electoral strength largely came from densely populated Prince George's County and Baltimore, where he improved on the margins of 2018 Democratic nominee Ben Jealous by roughly 20 percent. Moore's margin of victory was the highest of any gubernatorial candidate in the state since William Donald Schaefer in 1986.

2022.

Neuman.

Massachusetts

Governor Charlie Baker was re-elected to a second term in 2018 with 66.6% of the vote. Because Massachusetts does not have gubernatorial term limits in its Constitution, he was eligible to run for re-election for a third term. However, in December 2021, Baker announced he would not be running for re-election.

Geoff Diehl, a former state representative and Chris Doughty were running for the Republican nomination. Massachusetts attorney general Maura Healey and state senator Sonia Chang-Díaz were running for the Democratic nomination.

Diehl and Healey won their respective primaries on September 6.

Due to Massachusetts's strong liberal lean and Diehl's conservative political views, Healey was widely expected to win the election. The general election was called for the Democrat shortly after polls closed, with Healey becoming the first woman ever elected governor of Massachusetts and the first openly lesbian governor to take office in United States history.

Michigan

Incumbent Democratic Governor Gretchen Whitmer ran for re-election to a second term and faced former political commentator Tudor Dixon in the general election. Whitmer defeated Dixon by a vote margin of nearly 11 percentage points, a larger victory than when she was first elected four years prior.

Minnesota

Incumbent Democratic (DFL) Governor Tim Walz defeated the Republican nominee, former state senator Scott Jensen, winning a second term. 

In the end, Jensen's advantage in rural Greater Minnesota could not overcome Walz’s large lead in the Twin Cities metropolitan area, with Walz going on to win the election with a comfortable 7.7% margin. However, this was the first time ever in Walz's career that he lost Minnesota's 1st congressional district, the district that he used to represent in Congress and prior to this election, carried seven times in a row. This election was also the first time ever that Walz failed to carry the following counties in any election which he ran in: Freeborn County, Houston County, Mower County, and Winona County. Winona County was significant given the fact that President Joe Biden carried the county in 2020.

Nebraska

Incumbent Republican Governor Pete Ricketts was re-elected to a second term in 2018. He was term-limited by the Nebraska Constitution in 2022 and could not seek re-election for a third consecutive term. Incumbent Republican Governor Pete Ricketts was term-limited and unable to seek a third term.

In the general election, Republican Jim Pillen went on to win the gubernatorial election by a 23-point margin.

Nebraska's primary elections were held on May 10. Former University of Nebraska Board of Regents chair Jim Pillen won the Republican nomination, while state senator Carol Blood won the Democratic nomination.

The race took on increased importance in October 2022, when U.S. Senator Ben Sasse announced he would resign and Ricketts said he would allow the winner of the 2022 gubernatorial election to appoint Sasse's replacement. The winner, Jim Pillen, ultimately decided to appoint his predecessor (Ricketts) to fill Sasse's seat.

Nevada

Incumbent Governor Steve Sisolak, a Democrat, was elected in 2018 with 49.4% of the vote and ran for re-election to a second term. Sisolak lost re-election to a second term, being defeated by Republican nominee and Clark County Sheriff, Joe Lombardo.

Sisolak was the first Democrat to seek re-election to Nevada's governorship since Bob Miller in 1994, and was subsequently the only incumbent governor in the United States to lose re-election in the 2022 elections. Decision Desk HQ called the race for Lombardo on November 11. Amid a slate of failed gubernatorial pickup attempts, this was the only governorship Republicans flipped in the 2022 elections, as well as the only governorship in a state carried by one party in the prior presidential election to flip to the other party. This was also the first time since Pat Quinn's defeat in the 2014 Illinois gubernatorial election that an incumbent Democratic Governor had lost re-election.

Former Senator Dean Heller ran for the Republican Nomination as did North Las Vegas Mayor John Lee, and Clark County Sheriff Joe Lombardo. Lombardo won the Republican primary and faced Sisolak in November.

New Hampshire

Incumbent Republican Governor Chris Sununu was re-elected in 2020 with 65.1% of the vote and ran for a fourth term.  Physician Tom Sherman challenged Sununu as a Democrat. Chris Sununu won re-election to a fourth term.

New Mexico

Governor Michelle Lujan Grisham was elected in 2018 with 57.2% of the vote and is ran for a second term. The Republican nominee is former meteorologist Mark Ronchetti. Incumbent Democratic governor Michelle Lujan Grisham won a second term. She was first elected in 2018 with 57.2% of the vote. This was the first gubernatorial election in New Mexico since 1986 in which the winner was from the same party as the incumbent president.

New York

Governor Andrew Cuomo was re-elected to a third term in 2018 with 59.6% of the vote. Because New York does not have gubernatorial term limits in its Constitution, he was eligible to run for re-election for a fourth term. On May 28, 2019, Cuomo announced that he would run for re-election for a fourth term in 2022.

Cuomo was expected to face a primary challenge for the Democratic nomination as a result of allegations of sexual harassment involving Cuomo and a simultaneous investigation into his administration's cover-up of nursing home deaths during the COVID-19 pandemic. Cuomo resigned as governor at the end of August 23, 2021, upon which Lieutenant Governor Kathy Hochul became governor. Hochul has said she is running for a full gubernatorial term. Current New York Attorney General Letitia James was previously running against Hochul in the primary, but later changed her mind to run for re-election. Current New York City Public Advocate Jumaane Williams announced he would run against Hochul in the primary, as did current U.S. representative Thomas Suozzi. Hochul won the primary on June 28.

Republicans running for the gubernatorial nomination included former Westchester County executive Rob Astorino, Andrew Giuliani (the son of former New York City mayor Rudy Giuliani), businessman and former Obama administration official Harry Wilson, and congressman and former state senator Lee Zeldin. Zeldin is the official designee of both the New York Republican Party and the New York Conservative Party. Zeldin won the primary on June 28.

Larry Shape is the Libertarian candidate for governor. The state board of elections disqualified him for not meeting ballot access requirements. He continued as a write in candidate. He was also the Libertarian nominee in the 2018 election.

Ohio

Governor Mike DeWine was elected in 2018 with 50.4% of the vote and ran for re-election to a second term.

DeWine faced a primary challenge from former US Representative and 2018 Ohio Republican Senate Nominee Jim Renacci and farmer Joe Blystone. Former Dayton Mayor Nan Whaley and former Cincinnati Mayor John Cranley ran for the Democratic nomination.DeWine and Whaley won their respective primaries on May 3.

Incumbent Republican Governor Mike DeWine won re-election to a second term in a landslide, defeating Democrat nominee Nan Whaley, the former mayor of Dayton, 62.8% to 37.2%. DeWine's 25-point victory marked the continuation of a trend in which every incumbent Republican Governor of Ohio since 1978 has won re-election by a double digit margin.

This was the first time since 1994 in which Trumbull and Mahoning counties have gone to the Republican candidate with over 60% of the vote.

Oklahoma

Governor Kevin Stitt was elected in 2018 with 54.3% of the vote and is ran for re-election to a second term. Former state senator and physician Ervin Yen filed paperwork to challenge Stitt in the Republican Primary. Stitt won the primary on June 28.

On October 7, 2021, Oklahoma Superintendent of Public Instruction Joy Hofmeister announced she would be switching to the Democratic Party and subsequently announced her campaign for the Democratic nomination for Governor. Hofmeister won the nomination on June 28, defeating former state senator Connie Johnson in the primary. Natalie Bruno has filed to run for the Libertarian Party's nomination. Paul Tay has filed with the state ethics commission to run as an independent.

Incumbent Republican Governor Kevin Stitt was re-elected to a second term. State Superintendent of Public Instruction Joy Hofmeister was the Democratic nominee, former Republican state senator Ervin Yen ran as an independent, and Natalie Bruno was the Libertarian nominee.

Although Stitt won by a comfortable margin, his performance was the worst of any 2022 Republican candidate for statewide office in Oklahoma. Meanwhile, Hofmeister's performance was the second best of any 2022 Democratic statewide candidate in Oklahoma, only behind State Superintendent of Public Instruction nominee Jena Nelson.

Oregon

The incumbent governor, Democrat Kate Brown, took office on February 18, 2015, upon the resignation of John Kitzhaber. She was subsequently elected in the gubernatorial special election in 2016, and was re-elected to a full term in 2018. Due to term limits, she was ineligible for re-election in 2022.

The Oregonian anticipated the election to have "the first competitive Democratic primary in more than a decade and potentially the closest such race since 2002." Willamette Week anticipated a "wide open field of Democrats", citing the lack of an incumbent. Almost 20 Republican Party candidates ran for the office, including two previous nominees for governor in 1998 and 2016, as well as 15 Democrats and some non-affiliates/third-party members.

In the May 17 primary elections, former Oregon House Speaker Tina Kotek was declared the winner of the Democratic primary half an hour after the ballot deadline. The next day, former House Minority Leader Christine Drazan was determined to have won the Republican primary. Notably, the general election featured three prominent female candidates, including former state senator Betsy Johnson, who was a moderate Democrat, running as an independent.

Oregon was considered a possible Republican pickup, as Brown had the lowest approval rating of any governor in the United States at the time and Johnson could have siphoned votes from Kotek. Nonetheless, Kotek won the election by a slim margin, becoming Oregon's 7th consecutive Democratic governor. She became one of the first lesbian governors in the United States, along with Maura Healey in Massachusetts.

Pennsylvania

Governor Tom Wolf was re-elected in 2018 with 57.8% of the vote. He is term-limited in 2022 by the Pennsylvania Constitution and was therefore ineligible to seek election to a third consecutive term. 

Democratic state attorney general Josh Shapiro defeated Republican state senator Doug Mastriano in a landslide victory to succeed term-limited incumbent Democratic governor Tom Wolf. Primaries were held on May 17, 2022. Shapiro won the Democratic nomination after running unopposed and Mastriano won the Republican nomination with 44% of the vote. Mastriano's nomination drew attention due to his far-right political views.

Shapiro defeated Mastriano by almost 15 points, a margin consistent with most polls. Shapiro scored the largest margin for a non-incumbent candidate for governor since 1946, and his victory marked the first time since 1844 that the Democratic Party won three consecutive gubernatorial elections in Pennsylvania. Shapiro also made history by earning the most votes of any gubernatorial candidate in the state's history, garnering just over three million votes. Austin Davis was elected Lieutenant Governor, and became the second African-American elected to statewide office in the state's history, following Timothy DeFoor in 2020.

Shapiro's large margin of victory has been widely credited with helping down-ballot Democrats in concurrent elections.

Rhode Island

Incumbent Democratic Governor Dan McKee became Rhode Island's governor on March 2, 2021, when term-limited Gina Raimondo resigned following her confirmation as United States Secretary of Commerce. McKee easily won a full term on election day, defeating Republican Ashley Kalus by more than 19 percentage points.

McKee's margin of victory and vote share were the highest for any candidate for governor of Rhode Island since 1992.

South Carolina

Incumbent Republican Governor Henry McMaster ran for re-election for a second full term in office and secured the Republican nomination in the June 14 primary. Joe Cunningham, former United States Representative from South Carolina's 1st congressional district, was the Democratic nominee. 

McMaster won the general election with 58% of the vote — a subsequently larger majority than in 2018. McMaster took office on January 24, 2017, upon the resignation of Nikki Haley, and was elected to a full term in 2018.

South Dakota

Governor Kristi Noem was elected in 2018 with 51% of the vote, and ran for re-election to a second term. The Democratic nominee is state representative Jamie Smith. Noem won a second term, winning 62% of the vote.

Tennessee

Incumbent Republican Governor Bill Lee won re-election to a second term with almost 65% of the vote, Improving on his performance from 2018. The Democratic challenger was Jason Martin.

Lee flipped reliably Democratic Haywood County, home to Brownsville. It is one of only two remaining counties in Tennessee, along with Shelby County, with a majority African-American population. Haywood County has not voted Republican on a presidential level since 1972.

Texas
Incumbent Republican governor Greg Abbott won re-election to a third term, defeating Democratic nominee and former Congressman, Beto O'Rourke. All statewide elected offices are currently held by Republicans. In his previous gubernatorial race in 2018, Abbott won with 55.8% of the vote.

The Democratic and Republican primaries were held on March 1, 2022. O'Rourke and Abbott won outright majorities in their respective primaries, and therefore did not participate in the May 24 runoffs.

Texas has not voted for a Democratic candidate for governor since Ann Richards in 1990. Additionally, Abbott had a strong approval rating on election day, with 55% of voters approving to 45% disapproving. Beto O'Rourke, who gained national attention in 2018 for his unusually close and competitive campaign against Senator Ted Cruz, was widely viewed as a rising star in the Texas Democratic Party and potential challenger for Abbott, but a failed run for President of the United States in 2020 prompted criticisms of opportunism, via Republican attempts to brand him as anti-law enforcement and his former comments on guns.

Abbott won re-election by 10.9%, which is a margin slightly smaller than his 13.3% in 2018 in spite of a much redder national climate in 2022, making this the closest gubernatorial election in Texas since 2006, and the closest election of Abbott's entire political career since his first race for the Texas Supreme Court in 1998. Beto O'Rourke, meanwhile, performed 8.3% worse than his 2018 Senate run, but did still win the highest share for a Democratic gubernatorial candidate since Ann Richards received 45.88% in her unsuccessful reelection bid against George W. Bush in 1994. Abbott's raw vote total was less than his 4.65 million in 2018, while O'Rourke set a record of most raw votes for a Texas Democratic gubernatorial candidate at around 3.55 million, but was also less than his 4.04 million vote total in the 2018 Senate race.

Abbott carried 235 out of 254 counties in his re-election victory, flipping the heavily Hispanic counties of Culberson and Zapata and becoming the first Republican gubernatorial candidate to win the latter in the state's history (though Zapata had voted Republican in the 2020 presidential election), while O'Rourke became the first Democratic gubernatorial candidate to win the county of Fort Bend since 1974. O'Rourke outperformed Joe Biden two years prior among Latino voters though his performance with them was still worse than past nominees.

Vermont

Incumbent Republican Governor Phil Scott was re-elected in 2020 with 68.5% of the vote and ran for re-election to a fourth term. 

In the general election, incumbent Republican Governor Phil Scott easily defeated Democrat Brenda Siegel for his 4th consecutive term.

This race was one of six Republican-held governorships up for election in 2022 in a state carried by Joe Biden in the 2020 presidential election. Scott's victory, in which he carried every municipality in the state, is the largest by margin in a Vermont gubernatorial race since Howard Dean's landslide in 1996. Scott's 46-point victory margin was the largest for a Republican candidate since 1950, even while Democratic congressman Peter Welch won the concurrent U.S. Senate election by a 40-point margin.

Wisconsin

Incumbent Democratic governor Tony Evers won re-election to a second term, defeating Republican nominee, Tim Michels.

As Lieutenant Governor Mandela Barnes ran for the U.S. Senate in the concurrent election, a new Democratic running mate, state assemblywoman Sara Rodriguez, was nominated in the partisan primary. Barnes was the second lieutenant governor not to run with the incumbent governor since the state constitution was amended in 1967. The partisan primary was held on August 9, 2022, with businessman Tim Michels defeating former Lieutenant Governor Rebecca Kleefisch in the Republican primary. State senator Roger Roth received the Republican nomination for lieutenant governor.

This was the first gubernatorial election in Wisconsin since 2006 in which a Democrat won with an outright majority of the vote, the first since 1990 in which the winner was from the same party as the incumbent president, and the first since 1962 in which Wisconsin voted for a Democratic governor at the same time the party held the presidency. This was also the first gubernatorial election in the state since 1998 in which the winning candidate was of a different party than the winner of the concurrent U.S. Senate election.

Wyoming

Governor Mark Gordon was elected in 2018 with 67.1% of the vote and is running for re-election to a second term. Perennial candidate Rex Rammell and truck driver Aaron Nab were primary challenging Gordon.  

Gordon and Livingston won their primaries on August 16, 2022. Livingston's 16.3% of the vote was the worst performance that year in a gubernatorial or senate race, doing worse than Leslie Petersen's 22.9% in 2010 and Brenda Siegel's 26.2% in  Vermont 2022, and the worst performance by a Democrat in gubernatorial race in Wyoming history.

Territories and federal district

District of Columbia 

Mayor Muriel Bowser was re-elected in 2018 with 76.4% of the vote and ran for a third term. She was renominated, defeating city councilors Robert White and Trayon White in the primary. She defeated Republican nominee Stacia Hall and independent Rodney "Red" Grant. D.C. Statehood Green nominee Corren Brown did not appear in the general election ballot.

Guam

Governor Lou Leon Guerrero was elected in 2018 with 50.8% of the vote and ran for re-election to a second term. She was being challenged in the Democratic primary by U.S. House delegate Michael San Nicolas.

The only Republican candidate is former Governor Felix Camacho.

Guerrero and Camacho won their respective primaries on August 27.

On November 8, Guerrero won re-election, winning by an 11-point margin (a 13-point shift right since 2018).

Northern Mariana Islands

 
Governor Ralph Torres became governor on December 29, 2015, upon the death of incumbent governor Eloy Inos. He was elected to his first full term in 2018 with 62.2% of the vote. Torres was challenged by his lieutenant governor, Arnold Palacios, a career Republican who ran as an independent, and by Democratic representative Tina Sablan. Torres earned 38.8% of the votes in the general election, ahead of Palacios and Sablan, but since no candidate won a clear majority a runoff between Torres and Palacios was held on November 25. Palacios, who gained the backing of Sablan, won the runoff handily, earning 54.05% of the vote.

U.S. Virgin Islands

Governor Albert Bryan was elected in 2018 with 54.5% of the vote and ran for re-election to a second term. St. Croix Democratic Senator Kurt Vialet is running as an independent.

See also
2022 United States elections
2022 United States House of Representatives elections
2022 United States Senate elections

Notes

References

 
November 2022 events in the United States